2014 RC is a sub-kilometer near-Earth object and Apollo asteroid. The exceptionally fast rotator passed within  (0.1 lunar distances) of Earth on 7 September 2014. The asteroid is approximately the diameter of the Chelyabinsk meteor, and passed almost as close to Earth as 367943 Duende did in 2013.

Measurements by multiple telescopes indicate that the asteroid rotates in 15.8 seconds making it one of the fastest rotating asteroids so far discovered. Using the 15.8 second rotation period, more accurate radar observations by Goldstone shows the asteroid has a largest axis of at least . Due to the asteroid's fast rotation, it is a monolith and not a rubble pile.

2014 approach
It made a close approach to Earth of  (0.1 LD) around 18:02 UTC on 7 September 2014. The asteroid briefly brightened to about apparent magnitude 11.5, but it was still not visible to the naked eye or common binoculars. At the peak brightness the asteroid had a declination of –47, and was most easily visible over New Zealand. During 2014, asteroids 2014 AA and  have come closer to Earth.

The Managua explosion on 6 September 2014 may or may not have been created by a bolide that was missed by millions of people, but either way it was not caused by the close approach of 2014 RC.

Orbital shift 

During the 2014 Earth close approach the orbital period of 2014 RC was reduced from 600 days to 549 days. The orbital eccentricity decreased while the orbital inclination increased.

Close-approach table

See also
List of fast rotators (minor planets)

References

External links 
 ASTEROID 2014 RC Tracking
 Close Approach of Asteroid 2014 RC (Remanzacco Observatory)
 Small Asteroid Will Pass Earth Closely but Safely on Sunday (Phil Plait)
 
 
 

Minor planet object articles (unnumbered)

20140907
20140907
20140901